The Riverside Canal is an irrigation canal in El Paso County beginning southeast of El Paso, Texas. The canal is managed by the US Bureau of Reclamation. Water from the canal irrigates about 39,000 acres (160 km2). The canal and diversion dam is the southernmost system on an irrigation project extending along the Rio Grande in New Mexico and Texas. The canal supplies a canal network extending throughout the Upper Rio Grande Valley.

See also 
American Canal
Franklin Canal (Texas)
Texas Irrigation Canals
United States Bureau of Reclamation

External links
Rio Grande Project, US Bureau of Reclamation website

Canals in Texas
Irrigation canals
Transportation buildings and structures in El Paso County, Texas
United States Bureau of Reclamation